Michael Barry was the Senior Director for Intelligence Programs for the United States National Security Council (NSC) in 2017 and 2018. He succeeded Ezra Cohen-Watnick who left in August 2017. Barry's appointment was well received within the NSC due to having years of experience in government and respect for established protocol, and due to his predecessor Cohen-Watnick's repeated clashes with the CIA, fellow NSC staffers, and Cabinet officials. Barry has been a CIA official and served in the Air Force from 1982 and 1992, including as a special agent in its Air Force Office of Special Investigations and was deployed to Europe. According to his LinkedIn profile, he graduated from Northeastern University in 1982 with a Bachelor of Science degree in Criminal Justice. Barry was working in Afghanistan with Medecins du Monde in 1992.

According to BuzzFeed, shortly after the Sept. 11, 2001 terrorist attacks, Barry allegedly worked on a CIA sponsored assassination program to kill terrorists with Erik Prince.  Prince was removed from the program in 2006, and it was disbanded in 2009, after Barack Obama became president.

It was reported in July 2018 that Barry would be leaving his NSC position to return to CIA.

References

Living people
Northeastern University alumni
Year of birth missing (living people)
Place of birth missing (living people)
People of the Central Intelligence Agency
Trump administration personnel
United States National Security Council staffers
United States Air Force airmen
United States Air Force Office of Special Investigations